Associação Desportiva Itaboraí is a Brazilian football team from the city of Itaboraí, Rio de Janeiro state, founded on 30 June 1976.

Stadium
The home stadium Alziro Almeida has a capacity of 900 people. The stadium is also known as Alzirão.

Achievements
 Campeonato Carioca Third Level:
 Winners (1): 2015

Managerial history 
 Valdir Bigode (2011)

References

Association football clubs established in 1976
Football clubs in Rio de Janeiro (state)
1976 establishments in Brazil